Grupo Desportivo Alcochetense is a Portuguese football club located in Alcochete, Portugal. Alcochetense was founded on 1 January 1937, by local football supporters.

Colours and badge 
Alcochetense's colours are green and white, inspired by Sporting CP.

References

External links 
 Official website
 Soccerway Profile
 Fora de Jogo Profile

Football clubs in Portugal
Association football clubs established in 1937
1937 establishments in Portugal